Allmaniopsis is a genus of flowering plants belonging to the family Amaranthaceae.

Its native range is Kenya.

Species:

Allmaniopsis fruticulosa

References

Amaranthaceae
Amaranthaceae genera